, also called hara-kiri (a native Japanese kun reading), is a form of Japanese ritualistic suicide by disembowelment. While harakiri refers to the act of disemboweling one's self, seppuku refers to the ritual and usually would involve decapitation after the act as a sign of mercy. Harakiri refers solely to the act of disembowelment and would only be assigned as a punishment towards acts deemed too heinous for seppuku. It was originally reserved for samurai in their code of honour, but was also practiced by other Japanese people during the Shōwa period (particularly officers near the end of World War II) to restore honour for themselves or for their families. As a samurai practice, seppuku was used voluntarily by samurai to die with honour rather than fall into the hands of their enemies (and likely be tortured), as a form of capital punishment for samurai who had committed serious offences, or performed because they had brought shame to themselves. The ceremonial disembowelment, which is usually part of a more elaborate ritual and performed in front of spectators, consists of plunging a short blade, traditionally a tantō, into the belly and drawing the blade from left to right, slicing the belly open. If the cut is deep enough, it can sever the abdominal aorta, causing a rapid death by blood loss.

The first recorded act of seppuku was performed by Minamoto no Yorimasa during the Battle of Uji in 1180. Seppuku was used by warriors to avoid falling into enemy hands and to attenuate shame and avoid possible torture. Samurai could also be ordered by their daimyō (feudal lords) to carry out seppuku. Later, disgraced warriors were sometimes allowed to carry out seppuku rather than be executed in the normal manner. The most common form of seppuku for men was composed of the cutting of the abdomen, and when the samurai was finished, he stretched out his neck for an assistant to sever his spinal cord. It was the assistant's job to decapitate the samurai in one swing, otherwise it would bring great shame to the assistant and his family. Those who did not belong to the samurai caste were never ordered or expected to carry out seppuku. Samurai generally could carry out the act only with permission.

Sometimes a daimyō was called upon to perform seppuku as the basis of a peace agreement. This weakened the defeated clan so that resistance effectively ceased. Toyotomi Hideyoshi used an enemy's suicide in this way on several occasions, the most dramatic of which effectively ended a dynasty of daimyōs. When the Hōjō Clan were defeated at Odawara in 1590, Hideyoshi insisted on the suicide of the retired daimyō Hōjō Ujimasa and the exile of his son Ujinao; with this act of suicide, the most powerful daimyō family in eastern Japan was completely defeated.

Etymology

The term seppuku is derived from the two Sino-Japanese roots setsu  ("to cut", from Middle Chinese tset; compare Mandarin qiē and Cantonese chit) and fuku  ("belly", from MC pjuwk; compare Mandarin fù and Cantonese fūk).

It is also known as harakiri ("cutting the stomach"; often misspelled/mispronounced "hiri-kiri" or "hari-kari" by American English speakers). Harakiri is written with the same kanji as seppuku but in reverse order with an okurigana. In Japanese, the more formal seppuku, a Chinese on'yomi reading, is typically used in writing, while harakiri, a native kun'yomi reading, is used in speech. As Ross notes,

It is commonly pointed out that hara-kiri is a vulgarism, but this is a misunderstanding. Hara-kiri is a Japanese reading or Kun-yomi of the characters; as it became customary to prefer Chinese readings in official announcements, only the term seppuku was ever used in writing. So hara-kiri is a spoken term, but only to commoners and seppuku a written term, but spoken amongst higher classes for the same act.

The practice of performing seppuku at the death of one's master, known as oibara (追腹 or 追い腹, the kun'yomi or Japanese reading) or tsuifuku (追腹, the on'yomi or Chinese reading), follows a similar ritual.

The word  means "suicide" in Japanese. In some popular western texts, such as martial arts magazines, the term is associated with suicide of samurai wives. The term was introduced into English by Lafcadio Hearn in his Japan: An Attempt at Interpretation, an understanding which has since been translated into Japanese. Joshua S. Mostow notes that Hearn misunderstood the term jigai to be the female equivalent of seppuku.

Ritual
The practice was not standardized until the 17th century.  In the 12th and 13th centuries, such as with the seppuku of Minamoto no Yorimasa, the practice of a kaishakunin (idiomatically, his "second") had not yet emerged, thus the rite was considered far more painful.  The defining characteristic was plunging either the tachi (longsword), wakizashi (shortsword) or tantō (knife) into the gut and slicing the abdomen horizontally. In the absence of a kaishakunin, the samurai would then remove the blade and stab himself in the throat, or fall (from a standing position) with the blade positioned against his heart.

During the Edo period (1600–1867), carrying out seppuku came to involve an elaborate, detailed ritual. This was usually performed in front of spectators if it was a planned seppuku, as opposed to one performed on a battlefield. When he had finished, the knife and cloth were placed on another sanbo and given to the warrior. Dressed ceremonially, with his sword placed in front of him and sometimes seated on special clothes, the warrior would prepare for death by writing a death poem. He would probably consume an important ceremonial drink of sake. He would also give his attendant a cup meant for sake.

With his selected kaishakunin standing by, he would open his kimono, take up his tantōwhich the samurai held by the blade with a cloth wrapped around so that it would not cut his hand and cause him to lose his gripand plunge it into his abdomen, making a left-to-right cut. The kaishakunin would then perform kaishaku, a cut in which the warrior was partially decapitated. The maneuver should be done in the manners of dakikubi (lit. "embraced head"), in which way a slight band of flesh is left attaching the head to the body, so that it can be hung in front as if embraced. Because of the precision necessary for such a maneuver, the second was a skilled swordsman. The principal and the kaishakunin agreed in advance when the latter was to make his cut. Usually dakikubi would occur as soon as the dagger was plunged into the abdomen. Over time, the process became so highly ritualized that as soon as the samurai reached for his blade the kaishakunin would strike. Eventually even the blade became unnecessary and the samurai could reach for something symbolic like a fan, and this would trigger the killing stroke from his second. The fan was likely used when the samurai was too old to use the blade or in situations where it was too dangerous to give him a weapon.

This elaborate ritual evolved after seppuku had ceased being mainly a battlefield or wartime practice and became a para-judicial institution. The second was usually, but not always, a friend. If a defeated warrior had fought honorably and well, an opponent who wanted to salute his bravery would volunteer to act as his second.

In the Hagakure, Yamamoto Tsunetomo wrote:

A specialized form of seppuku in feudal times was known as kanshi (諫死, "remonstration death/death of understanding"), in which a retainer would commit suicide in protest of a lord's decision. The retainer would make one deep, horizontal cut into his abdomen, then quickly bandage the wound. After this, the person would then appear before his lord, give a speech in which he announced the protest of the lord's action, then reveal his mortal wound. This is not to be confused with funshi (憤死, indignation death), which is any suicide made to protest or state dissatisfaction.

Some samurai chose to perform a considerably more taxing form of seppuku known as jūmonji giri (十文字切り, "cross-shaped cut"), in which there is no kaishakunin to put a quick end to the samurai's suffering. It involves a second and more painful vertical cut on the belly. A samurai performing jūmonji giri was expected to bear his suffering quietly until he bled to death, passing away with his hands over his face.

Female ritual suicide
Female ritual suicide (incorrectly referred to in some English sources as jiigai), was practiced by the wives of samurai who have performed seppuku or brought dishonor.

Some women belonging to samurai families committed suicide by cutting the arteries of the neck with one stroke, using a knife such as a tantō or kaiken. The main purpose was to achieve a quick and certain death in order to avoid capture. Before committing suicide, a woman would often tie her knees together so her body would be found in a “dignified” pose, despite the convulsions of death. Invading armies would often enter homes to find the lady of the house seated alone, facing away from the door. On approaching her, they would find that she had ended her life long before they reached her.

History
Stephen R. Turnbull provides extensive evidence for the practice of female ritual suicide, notably of samurai wives, in pre-modern Japan. One of the largest mass suicides was the 25 April 1185 final defeat of Taira no Tomomori. The wife of Onodera Junai, one of the Forty-seven Ronin, is a notable example of a wife following seppuku of a samurai husband. A large number of honor suicides marked the defeat of the Aizu clan in the Boshin War of 1869, leading into the Meiji era. For example, in the family of Saigō Tanomo, who survived, a total of twenty-two female honor suicides are recorded among one extended family.

Religious and social context
Voluntary death by drowning was a common form of ritual or honor suicide. The religious context of thirty-three Jōdo Shinshū adherents at the funeral of Abbot Jitsunyo in 1525 was faith in Amida Buddha and belief in rebirth in his Pure land, but male seppuku did not have a specifically religious context. By way of contrast, the religious beliefs of Hosokawa Gracia, the Christian wife of daimyō Hosokawa Tadaoki, prevented her from committing suicide.

Terminology
The word  means "suicide" in Japanese. In some popular western texts, such as martial arts magazines, the term is associated with suicide of samurai wives. The term was introduced into English by Lafcadio Hearn in his Japan: An Attempt at Interpretation, an understanding which has since been translated into Japanese and Hearn seen through Japanese eyes. Joshua S. Mostow notes that Hearn misunderstood the term jigai to be the female equivalent of seppuku. Mostow's context is analysis of Giacomo Puccini's Madame Butterfly and the original Cio-Cio San story by John Luther Long. Though both Long's story and Puccini's opera predate Hearn's use of the term jigai, the term has been used in relation to western Japonisme, which is the influence of Japanese culture on the western arts.

As capital punishment
While the voluntary seppuku is the best known form, in practice the most common form of seppuku was obligatory seppuku, used as a form of capital punishment for disgraced samurai, especially for those who committed a serious offense such as rape, robbery, corruption, unprovoked murder or treason. The samurai were generally told of their offense in full and given a set time for them to commit seppuku, usually before sunset on a given day. On occasion, if the sentenced individuals were uncooperative, seppuku could be carried out by an executioner, or more often, the actual execution was carried out solely by decapitation while retaining only the trappings of seppuku; even the tantō laid out in front of the uncooperative offender could be replaced with a fan (to prevent the uncooperative offenders from using the tantō as a weapon against the observers or the executioner). This form of involuntary seppuku was considered shameful and undignified. Unlike voluntary seppuku, seppuku carried out as capital punishment by executioners did not necessarily absolve, or pardon, the offender's family of the crime. Depending on the severity of the crime, all or part of the property of the condemned could be confiscated, and the family would be punished by being stripped of rank, sold into long-term servitude, or executed.

Seppuku was considered the most honorable capital punishment apportioned to samurai.  Zanshu (斬首) and sarashikubi (晒し首), decapitation followed by a display of the head, was considered harsher and was reserved for samurai who committed greater crimes.  Harshest punishments, usually involving death by torturous methods like kamayude (釜茹で), death by boiling, were reserved for commoner offenders.

Forced seppuku came to be known as "conferred death" over time as it was used for punishment of criminal samurai.

Recorded events

On February 15, 1868, eleven French sailors of the Dupleix entered the town of Sakai without official permission. Their presence caused panic among the residents. Security forces were dispatched to turn the sailors back to their ship, but a fight broke out and the sailors were shot dead. Upon the protest of the French representative, financial compensation was paid, and those responsible were sentenced to death. Captain Abel-Nicolas Bergasse du Petit-Thouars was present to observe the execution. As each samurai committed ritual disembowelment, the violent act shocked the captain, and he requested a pardon, as a result of which nine of the samurai were spared. This incident was dramatized in a famous short story, "Sakai Jiken", by Mori Ōgai.

In the 1860s, the British Ambassador to Japan, Algernon Freeman-Mitford (Lord Redesdale), lived within sight of Sengaku-ji where the Forty-seven Ronin are buried. In his book Tales of Old Japan, he describes a man who had come to the graves to kill himself:

Mitford also describes his friend's eyewitness account of a seppuku:

During the Meiji Restoration, the Tokugawa shogun's aide performed seppuku:

In his book Tales of Old Japan, Mitford describes witnessing a hara-kiri:
As a corollary to the above elaborate statement of the ceremonies proper to be observed at the harakiri, I may here describe an instance of such an execution which I was sent officially to witness. The condemned man was Taki Zenzaburo, an officer of the Prince of Bizen, who gave the order to fire upon the foreign settlement at Hyōgo in the month of February 1868,an attack to which I have alluded in the preamble to the story of the Eta Maiden and the Hatamoto. Up to that time no foreigner had witnessed such an execution, which was rather looked upon as a traveler's fable.

The ceremony, which was ordered by the Mikado (Emperor) himself, took place at 10:30 at night in the temple of Seifukuji, the headquarters of the Satsuma troops at Hiogo. A witness was sent from each of the foreign legations. We were seven foreigners in all. After another profound obeisance, Taki Zenzaburo, in a voice which betrayed just so much emotion and hesitation as might be expected from a man who is making a painful confession, but with no sign of either in his face or manner, spoke as follows:

Bowing once more, the speaker allowed his upper garments to slip down to his girdle, and remained naked to the waist. Carefully, according to custom, he tucked his sleeves under his knees to prevent himself from falling backwards; for a noble Japanese gentleman should die falling forwards. Deliberately, with a steady hand, he took the dirk that lay before him; he looked at it wistfully, almost affectionately; for a moment he seemed to collect his thoughts for the last time, and then stabbing himself deeply below the waist on the left-hand side, he drew the dirk slowly across to the right side, and, turning it in the wound, gave a slight cut upwards. During this sickeningly painful operation he never moved a muscle of his face. When he drew out the dirk, he leaned forward and stretched out his neck; an expression of pain for the first time crossed his face, but he uttered no sound. At that moment the kaishaku, who, still crouching by his side, had been keenly watching his every movement, sprang to his feet, poised his sword for a second in the air; there was a flash, a heavy, ugly thud, a crashing fall; with one blow the head had been severed from the body.

A dead silence followed, broken only by the hideous noise of the blood throbbing out of the inert heap before us, which but a moment before had been a brave and chivalrous man. It was horrible.

The kaishaku made a low bow, wiped his sword with a piece of rice paper which he had ready for the purpose, and retired from the raised floor; and the stained dirk was solemnly borne away, a bloody proof of the execution. The two representatives of the Mikado then left their places, and, crossing over to where the foreign witnesses sat, called us to witness that the sentence of death upon Taki Zenzaburo had been faithfully carried out. The ceremony being at an end, we left the temple. The ceremony, to which the place and the hour gave an additional solemnity, was characterized throughout by that extreme dignity and punctiliousness which are the distinctive marks of the proceedings of Japanese gentlemen of rank; and it is important to note this fact, because it carries with it the conviction that the dead man was indeed the officer who had committed the crime, and no substitute. While profoundly impressed by the terrible scene it was impossible at the same time not to be filled with admiration of the firm and manly bearing of the sufferer, and of the nerve with which the kaishaku performed his last duty to his master.

In modern Japan
Seppuku as judicial punishment was abolished in 1873, shortly after the Meiji Restoration, but voluntary seppuku did not completely die out. Dozens of people are known to have committed seppuku since then, including General Nogi and his wife on the death of Emperor Meiji in 1912, and numerous soldiers and civilians who chose to die rather than surrender at the end of World War II. The practice had been widely praised in army propaganda, which featured a soldier captured by the Chinese in the Shanghai Incident (1932) who returned to the site of his capture to perform seppuku. In 1944, Hideyoshi Obata, a Lieutenant General in the Imperial Japanese Army, committed seppuku in Yigo, Guam, following the Allied victory over the Japanese in the Second Battle of Guam. Obata was posthumously promoted to the rank of general. Many other high-ranking military officials of Imperial Japan would go on to commit seppuku toward the latter half of World War II in 1944 and 1945, as the tide of the war turned against the Japanese, and it became clear that a Japanese victory of the war was not achievable.
In 1970, author Yukio Mishima and one of his followers performed public seppuku at the Japan Self-Defense Forces headquarters following an unsuccessful attempt to incite the armed forces to stage a coup d'état. Mishima performed seppuku in the office of General Kanetoshi Mashita. His second, a 25-year-old man named Masakatsu Morita, tried three times to ritually behead Mishima but failed, and his head was finally severed by Hiroyasu Koga, a former kendo champion. Morita then attempted to perform seppuku himself but when his own cuts were too shallow to be fatal, he gave the signal and was beheaded by Koga.

Notable cases
List of notable seppuku cases in chronological order.

 Minamoto no Tametomo (1170)
 Minamoto no Yorimasa (1180)
 Minamoto no Yoshitsune (1189)
 Hōjō Takatoki (1333)
 Ashikaga Mochiuji (1439)
 Azai Nagamasa (1573)
 Oda Nobunaga (1582)
 Takeda Katsuyori (1582)
 Shibata Katsuie (1583)
 Hōjō Ujimasa (1590)
 Sen no Rikyū (1591)
 Toyotomi Hidetsugu (1595)
 Torii Mototada (1600)
 Tokugawa Tadanaga (1634)
 Forty-six of the Forty-seven rōnin (1703)
 Watanabe Kazan (1841)
 Tanaka Shinbei (1863)
 Takechi Hanpeita (1865)
 Yamanami Keisuke (1865)
 Byakkotai (group of samurai youths) (1868)
 Saigō Takamori (1877)
 Emilio Salgari (1911)
 Nogi Maresuke and Nogi Shizuko (1912)
 Chujiro Hayashi (1940)
 Seigō Nakano (1943)
 Yoshitsugu Saitō (1944)
 Hideyoshi Obata (1944)
 Kunio Nakagawa (1944)
 Isamu Chō and Mitsuru Ushijima (1945)
 Korechika Anami (1945)
 Takijirō Ōnishi (1945)
 Yukio Mishima (1970)
 Masakatsu Morita (1970)
 Isao Inokuma (2001)

In popular culture
The expected honor-suicide of the samurai wife is frequently referenced in Japanese literature and film, such as in Taiko by Eiji Yoshikawa, Humanity and Paper Balloons, and Rashomon. Seppuku is referenced and described multiple times in the 1975 James Clavell novel, Shōgun; its subsequent 1980 miniseries Shōgun brought the term and the concept to mainstream Western attention.  It was staged by the young protagonist in the 1971 dark American comedy Harold and Maude.

In Puccini's 1904 opera Madame Butterfly, wronged child-bride Cio-Cio-san commits Seppuku in the final moments of the opera, after hearing that the father of her child, although he has finally returned to Japan, much to her initial delight, has in the meantime married an American lady and has come to take the child away from her.

Throughout the novels depicting the 30th century and onward Battletech universe, members of House Kurita – who are based on feudal Japanese culture, despite the futuristic setting – frequently atone for their failures by performing seppuku.

In the 2003, film The Last Samurai, the act of seppuku is depicted twice. The defeated Imperial officer General Hasegawa commits seppuku, while his enemy Katsumoto (Ken Watanabe) acts as kaishakunin and decapitates him.  Later, the mortally wounded samurai leader Katsumoto performs seppuku with former US Army Captain Nathan Algren's help. This is also depicted en masse in the film 47 Ronin starring Keanu Reeves when the 47 ronin are punished for disobeying the shogun's orders by avenging their master.  In the 2011 film My Way, an Imperial Japanese colonel is ordered to commit seppuku by his superiors after ordering a retreat from an oil field overrun by Russian and Mongolian troops in the 1939 Battle of Khalkin Gol.

In Season 15 Episode 12 of Law & Order: Special Victims Unit, titled "Jersey Breakdown", a Japanophile New Jersey judge with a large samurai sword collection commits harakiri when he realizes that the police are onto him for raping a 12-year-old Japanese girl in a Jersey nightclub.  Seppuku is depicted in season 1, episode 5, of the Amazon Prime Video TV series The Man in the High Castle (2015). In this dystopian alternate history, the Japanese Imperial Force controls the West coast of the United States after a Nazi victory against the Allies in World War Two. During the episode, the Japanese crown prince makes an official visit to San Francisco but is shot during a public address. The captain of the Imperial Guard commits seppuku because of his failure of ensuring the prince's security. The head of the Kenpeitai, Chief Inspector Takeshi Kido, states he will do the same if the assassin is not apprehended.

In the 2014 dark fantasy action role-playing video game Dark Souls II, the boss Sir Alonne performs the act of seppuku if the player defeats him within three minutes or if the player takes no damage, to retain his honor as a samurai by not falling into his enemies' hands. in the 2015 re-release Scholar of the First Sin, it is obtainable only if the player takes no damage whatsoever.

In the 2015 tactical role-playing video game Fire Emblem Fates, Hoshidan high prince Ryoma takes his own life through the act of seppuku, which he believes will let him retain his honor as a samurai by not falling into the hands of his enemies.

In the 2016 film, Hacksaw Ridge, it is briefly shown that the leaders of the Japanese forces associated with the Battle of Okinawa committed seppuku after it became clear that they lost.

In the 2017 revival and final season of the animated series Samurai Jack, the eponymous protagonist, distressed over his many failures to accomplish his quest as told in prior seasons, is then informed by a haunting samurai spirit that he has acted dishonorably by allowing many people to suffer and die from his failures, and must perform seppuku to atone for them.

In the 2022 dark fantasy action role-playing video game Elden Ring, the player can receive the ability seppuku, which has the player stab themselves through the stomach and then pull it out, coating their weapon in blood to increase their damage.

See also

 Harakiri – film by Masaki Kobayashi
 Japanese funeral
 Junshi – following the lord in death
 Kamikaze, Japanese suicide bombers
 Puputan, Indonesian ritual suicide
 Shame society
 Suicide in Japan

References

Further reading 

 
 
 
 
 Seppuku  – A Practical Guide (tongue-in-cheek)
 
 
 
 Zuihoden – The mausoleum of Date MasamuneWhen he died, twenty of his followers killed themselves to serve him in the next life. They lay in state at Zuihoden
 Seppuku and "cruel punishments" at the end of Tokugawa Shogunate
 Tokugawa Shogunate edict banning Junshi (Following one's lord in death) From the Buke Sho Hatto (1663) –
"That the custom of following a master in death is wrong and unprofitable is a caution which has been at times given of old; but, owing to the fact that it has not actually been prohibited, the number of those who cut their belly to follow their lord on his decease has become very great. For the future, to those retainers who may be animated by such an idea, their respective lords should intimate, constantly and in very strong terms, their disapproval of the custom. If, notwithstanding this warning, any instance of the practice should occur, it will be deemed that the deceased lord was to blame for unreadiness. Henceforward, moreover, his son and successor will be held to be blameworthy for incompetence, as not having prevented the suicides."

External links
 
 

 
Japanese culture
Japanese words and phrases
Suicide methods